is a Japanese former professional footballer who played as a forward.

Club statistics

References

External links

library.footballjapan.jp

1981 births
Living people
People from Iizuka, Fukuoka
Association football people from Fukuoka Prefecture
Japanese footballers
Japanese expatriate footballers
J1 League players
J2 League players
Japan Football League players
Avispa Fukuoka players
V-Varen Nagasaki players
Association football forwards